This is a list of compositions by Isaac Albéniz (1860–1909).

Albéniz was a prolific composer who composed a vast number of works across a variety of different genres. However, the great majority of his works are now either lost, not publicly accessible, incomplete, or unrealized, as evident by the large number of missing published compositions.

Works with opus numbers 
The following is a list of Albéniz's works that have an Opus number.
 Op. 12: Pavana-Capricho for piano (1884)
 Op. 23: Barcarola in D-flat major for piano (1884)
 Op. 25: 6 Pequeños Valses for piano (1884)
 No. 1 in A-flat major
 No. 2 in E-flat major
 No. 3 in A major
 No. 4 in E-flat major
 No. 5 in F major
 No. 6 in A-flat major
 Op. 28: Piano Sonata No. 1 in A-flat major (1884)
 First movement:
 Second movement: Scherzo
 Third movement:
 Fourth movement (?):
 Op. 37: Danzas Españolas for piano (1887)
 No. 1 in D major
 No. 2 in B-flat major
 No. 3 in E-flat major
 No. 4 in G major
 No. 5 in A-flat major
 No. 6 in D major
 Op. 40: Deseo, Estudio de Concierto in B minor for piano (1885)
 Op. 47: Suite Española No. 1 for piano (1882–89)
 No. 1: Granada
 No. 2: Cataluña
 No. 3: Sevilla
 No. 4: Cádiz
 No. 5: Asturias
 No. 6: Aragón
 No. 7: Castilla
 No. 8: Cuba
 Op. 54: Suite Ancienne No. 1 for piano (1886)
 No. 1: Gavotta
 No. 2: Minueto
 Op. 56: Estudio Impromptu in B minor for piano (1886)
 Op. 60: Piano Sonata No. 2 (lost)
 Op. 64: Suite Ancienne No. 2 for piano (1886)
 No. 1: Sarabanda
 No. 2: Chaconne
 Op. 65: 7 estudios en los tonos naturales mayores for piano (1886)
 No. 1 in C major
 No. 2 in G major
 No. 3 in D major
 No. 4 in A major
 No. 5 in E major
 No. 6 in B major
 No. 7 in F major
 Op. 66: 
Rapsodia Cubana for piano
6 Mazurkas de salon for piano
 Op. 68: Piano Sonata No. 3 in A-flat major (1886)
 First Movement: Allegretto
 Second Movement: Andante
 Third Movement: Allegro assai
 Op. 70: Rapsodia Española for piano and orchestra (1886)
 Op. 71: Recuerdos de Viaje for piano (1886–87)
 No. 1: En el mar (barcarola)
 No. 2: Leyenda (barcarola)
 No. 3: Alborada No. 4: En la Alhambra No. 5: Puerta de Tierra No. 6: Rumores de la Caleta (malagueña)
 No. 7: En la playa Op. 72: Piano Sonata No. 4 in A major (1887)
 First Movement: Allegro
 Second Movement: Scherzo: Allegro
 Third Movement: Minuetto: Andantino
 Fourth Movement: Rondo: Allegro
 Op. 78: Concierto Fantástico for piano and orchestra (1887)
 First Movement: Allegro ma non troppo
 Second Movement: Rêverie et Scherzo: Andante – Presto
 Third Movement: Allegro
 Op. 80: Recuerdos, Mazurka in G-flat major for piano
 Op. 81: Mazurka de Salon in E-flat major for piano
 Op. 82: Piano Sonata No. 5 in G-flat major (1887 ca.)
 First Movement: Allegro non troppo
 Second Movement: Minuetto del Gallo
 Third Movement: Rêverie
 Fourth Movement: Allegro
 Op. 83: Pavana fácil para manos pequeñas for piano (1888)
 Op. 92: 12 Piezas características for piano (1888)
 No. 1: Gavotte No. 2: Minuetto a Sylvia No. 3: Barcarola (Ciel sans nuages) No. 4: Plegaria No. 5: Conchita (Polka)
 No. 6: Pilar (Vals)
 No. 7: Zambra No. 8: Pavana No. 9: Polonesa No. 10: Mazurka No. 11: Staccato (Capricho)
 No. 12: Torre Bermeja (Serenata)
 Op. 95: Mazurka de Salon in E-flat major ("Amalia") for piano (1888)
 Op. 96: Mazurka de Salon in D minor ("Ricordatti") for piano (1889)
 Op. 97: Suite Española No. 2 for piano (1888)
 No. 1: Zaragoza No. 2: Sevilla No. 3: Cadiz-gaditana No. 4: Zambra granadina Op. 101: Rêves for piano (1891)
 No. 1: Berceuse No. 2: Scherzino No. 3: Canton de amor Op. 102: Berceuse for cello/violin and piano
 Op. 111: Piano Sonata No. 7 in E-flat major
 First movement:
 Second movement: Minuetto
 Third movement:
 Fourth movement (?):
 Op. 164: 2 Danzas Espagñoles for piano (1889 ca.)
 No. 1: Jota Aragonesa No. 2: Tango Op. 165: España for piano (1890)
 No. 1: Preludio No. 2: Tango No. 3: Malagueña No. 4: Serenata No. 5: Capricho Catalan No. 6: Zortzico Op. 170: L'Automne-Valse for piano (1890s)
 Op. 181: Célèbre sérénade Espagnole for piano (1889 ca.)
 Op. 201: Les saisons for piano (1892)
 No. 1: Le printemps No. 2: L'été No. 3: L'automne No. 4: L'hiver Op. 202: Mallorca for piano
 Op. 232: Cantos de España for piano (1892, rev.1898)
 No. 1: Prelude
 No. 2: Orientale No. 3: Sous le palmier No. 4: Córdoba No. 5: Seguidillas Works without opus number 
The rest of known works from Albéniz, which also includes ones that are lost, partially lost, incomplete, publicly inaccessible, or unrealized compositions. Some of the works listed in this section have an unknown opus number, however it is not listed in the section above to preserve the accuracy.

 Works for piano 
 Angustia: Romanza sin palabras (1886)
 Arbola-pian, zortzico Azulejos (incomplete; finished by Enrique Granados) (1909)
 Balbina Valverde Cádiz-gaditana Champagne 6 Danzas españolas Diva sin par (1886)
 Iberia in 4 books (1907-1908)
 Book 1:EvocaciónEl puertoFête-Dieu à Séville Book 2:RondeñaAlmeríaTriana Book 3:El AlbaicínEl poloLavapiés Book 4:MálagaJerezEritaña 3 Improvisations (Live performances recorded at the home of Ruperto Regordosa Planas on three Wax Cylinders in 1903. Transcribed by pianist Milton Ruben Laufer in 2009.)
 Marcha Militar (1868) Minuetto No. 1 (lost)
 Minuetto No. 2 (lost)
 Minuetto No. 3 in A-flat major Navarra (incomplete; finished by his pupil Déodat de Séverac)
 Piano Sonata No. 6 (lost)
 Serenata árabe 2 Souvenirs: Prelude, Asturias (1899) Suite Ancienne No. 3 La Vega (1897)
 Zambra Granadina Zortzico in B minor Works for piano and orchestra 
 Piano Concerto No. 2 in E (incomplete) (1892)

 Orchestral works 
 Suite Catalonia (part 1 completed, part 2 and 3 unrealized)
 Suite característica (1889)
 Escenas Sinfonicas (1888)

 Vocal works 

 Songs for solo voice and piano 
 6 baladas Marquesa de Boloños The Catepillar Chanson de Barberine Conseil tenu par les rats (incomplete)
 The gifts of God Il en est de l'ámour Laughing at Love (incomplete)
 2 morceaux en Prose Rimas de Bécquer (6 songs)
 4 Songs
 6 Songs (all but Nos. 2 and 3 are lost)
 To Nellie (6 songs)

 For chorus 
 Domine, ne in furore tuo funeral music from Psalm 6

 Stage works 

 Zarzuelas 
 Cuanto más viejo (1881–1882, lost)
 Catalanes de gracia (1882, lost)
 San Antonio de la Florida (1894)
 La real Hambra (1902, incomplete)

 Operas 
 The Magic Opal (1892–1893)
 Pepita Giménez (January 1895)
 Henry Clifford (May 1895)
 Merlin (1897–1902)
 Lancelot (1902–1903, incomplete)
 Guinevere'' (unrealized)

External links

Albeniz, Isaac